The spotted seabass (Dicentrarchus punctatus) is a species of temperate bass native to marine and brackish waters of the coastal eastern Atlantic Ocean from the English Channel to the Canary Islands and Senegal, as well as through the Mediterranean Sea.

Habitat 
The spotted seabass generally lives in brackish water at depths below approximately 30 meters. It generally lives in subtropical waters, ranging from the coast of Brittany in the north to the coast of Africa and the Canary Islands in the south and also encompassing almost all of the coastline of the eastern Mediterranean Sea and going as far west as the Azores.

Description 
The spotted seabass can grow up to a size of about 70 cm; however, it usually only reaches a size of about 30 cm. It is a silver-gray fish covered in black spots and also has a blue back whilst alive. These black spots are only found on the adults; as well, the opercle has a rather large black spot.

Biology 
The spotted seabass is almost exclusively carnivorous. Its diet is largely composed of shrimp and molluscs; additionally, it at times eats smaller fish than itself. The spotted seabass breeds at various times based on geography; in the Mediterranean it generally spawns from January until March whereas in the English Channel and other northern areas this range is from March until May.

References 

Dicentrarchus
Fish of the Atlantic Ocean
Fish of the Mediterranean Sea
Fish of the North Sea
Fish of Africa
Fish of Europe
Fish described in 1792